William Swan Garvin (July 25, 1806 – February 20, 1883) was a western Pennsylvania newspaper proprietor who is most widely known for his term as a Jacksonian and Democratic member of the U.S. House of Representatives.

Early years
Garvin was born in Mercer, Pennsylvania.  At 13, he became an apprentice for Mercer County's Western Press, a Democratic newspaper.

Career
After journeying as a newspaper printer, in 1830 he returned to the Western Press as its proprietor, a  position he held off and on for the rest of his life.

Garvin was postmaster of Mercer from 1837 to 1841.

Garvin was elected as a Democrat to the Twenty-ninth Congress.  He served as chairman of the United States House Committee on Expenditures on Public Buildings during that session.

He also served as a flour inspector in Pittsburgh and was again appointed postmaster of Mercer in 1867 and served until 1869.

Garvin died on February 20, 1883, and was buried in Mercer Citizens’ Cemetery.

Sources

 

1806 births
1883 deaths
People from Mercer, Pennsylvania
Editors of Pennsylvania newspapers
Pennsylvania postmasters
Democratic Party members of the United States House of Representatives from Pennsylvania
American male journalists
19th-century American male writers
19th-century American politicians
19th-century American newspaper editors